Harmonicon is a genus of South American curtain web spiders that was first described by F. O. Pickard-Cambridge in 1896.

Species
 it contains four species:
Harmonicon audeae Maréchal & Marty, 1998 – French Guiana
Harmonicon cerberus Pedroso & Baptista, 2014 – Brazil
Harmonicon oiapoqueae Drolshagen & Bäckstam, 2011 – French Guiana
Harmonicon rufescens F. O. Pickard-Cambridge, 1896 (type) – Brazil

References

External links

Dipluridae
Mygalomorphae genera